Serbia participated in the Junior Eurovision Song Contest 2021, held in Paris, France.

Background

In the  contest, Serbia placed 11th with Petar Aničić and the song "Heartbeat".

Before Junior Eurovision

On 5 October 2021, RTS announced that Jovana Radonjić and Dunja Živković would represent Serbia in the contest with the song "Oči deteta (Children's Eyes)". The song was presented on 28 October 2021.

At Junior Eurovision
After the opening ceremony, which took place on 13 December 2021, it was announced that Serbia would perform seventeenth on 19 December 2021, following Spain and preceding North Macedonia.

At the end of the contest, Serbia received 86 points, placing 13th out of 19 participating countries.

Voting

Detailed voting results

References

Junior Eurovision Song Contest
Serbia
2021